The Great Lakes Science Center is a museum and educational facility in downtown Cleveland, Ohio, United States.
Many of the exhibits document the features of the natural environment in the Great Lakes region of the United States. The facility includes signature (permanent) and traveling exhibits, meeting space, a cafe, and an IMAX Dome theater.

Great Lakes Science Center is funded by the citizens of Cuyahoga County through Cuyahoga Arts and Culture, grants, funds, and corporate and individual gifts.

The museum opened in July 1996. The center's exhibits support STEM (science, technology, engineering, math) with exhibits including the BioMedTech Gallery, advanced energy, science phenomena and space. The Science Center is home to the NASA Glenn Visitor Center, one of only 11 such Visitor Centers in the country. Also, Science Center staff conduct daily science demonstrations.

Throughout the school year, the Science Center provides STEM education to field trip students each year with programs and exhibits supporting classroom curriculum by meeting Ohio Revised Standards in Science. It also provides educator professional development programming. Homeschool workshops and programs are offered October through February. During the summer, the Science Center offers educational and fun camps for preschoolers through 12th graders that occur in various locations throughout Northeast Ohio. Year round, the Science Center provides classes, workshops, sleepovers and scout programs, as well as seasonal events for families, kids and adults.

The Science Center installed a wind turbine in its front yard in summer 2006. The wind turbine provides approximately 7% of the Science Center's annual electrical needs. A year later, it completed the installation of a 300-foot solar array canopy featuring 156 photovoltaic panels that provide enough power to light all of the Science Center's 65,000 square feet of exhibition space for one hour. During the course of a year, the solar array produces an average of 100 kWh per day, the equivalent of the average electrical usage of four homes. The Science Center also offers alternative energy exhibitions for guests to interact with a touch-screen kiosk displaying both real-time and historical data.

The Great Lakes Science Center is located between FirstEnergy Stadium and the Rock and Roll Hall of Fame at North Coast Harbor on the shore of Lake Erie. Discounted parking is available for guests in the attached 500-car garage.

NASA Glenn Visitor Center

Previously located at the NASA Glenn Research Center located on Cleveland's south side, the NASA Glenn Visitor Center began to relocate within the Great Lakes Science Center in early 2010. Admittance is included with the Science Center's general admission.

The NASA Glenn Visitor Center offers galleries, interactive exhibits, artifacts and NASA media. Great Lakes Science Center also hosts monthly Space Saturday programs featuring space-themed activities, and an annual Space Adventure Week with space-themed events and programs, and guest speakers from NASA Glenn Research Center. Programs are free with paid general admission to the Science Center.

DOME Theater
The Great Lakes Science Center also holds the DOME Theater. The theater, called "The Cleveland Clinic DOME Theater," uses 70mm film, a 15,000 Watt projector light and a six channel sound system. The projector weighs 4200Lb (1910 kg) and uses 5.6 feet of film per second. The Theater shows films shot in IMAX, the world's largest film format. The theater is 79 feet tall and seats 300 people. There is a separate admission fee.

Steamship William G. Mather
The 1925-built Steamship Mather is a restored 618-foot historic Great Lakes freighter. The flagship has huge cargo holds, brass and oak pilot house, guest quarters, and four-story engine room.  There is a separate admission fee.  Commonly referred to as "The Ship That Built Cleveland".

Great Science Academy
Great Science Academy is a multi-year, immersive science program for youth in grades 6-12 that uses project-based learning to engage teens in solving real-world challenges. Topics include Great Lakes (grade 6), Space and Aeronautics (7), Biomedical Technology (8) and Design and Innovation (9).

Great Science Academy is a 2014 recipient of a Noyce Foundation Bright Lights Community Engagement Prize. The initiative was created to recognize U.S. science centers, children's museums, and natural history museums that have done an outstanding job of engaging with their local communities, with a particular interest in outreach efforts that include some aspect of science, technology, engineering or math (STEM).

MC2 STEM High School
MC2 STEM High School is the result of an innovative partnership between the Cleveland Metropolitan School District (CMSD) and the Science Center. Focusing on STEM education (science, technology, engineering and math), the school furthers the mission of both organizations and makes science education come alive.
 
Designed as a project-based learning environment, the MC2 STEM High School exposes students to the design and implementation practices scientists and engineers use. 
 
School is in session year-round, with students working for 10 weeks, taking a three-week break and then repeating that pattern for four 10-week terms throughout the year.

Cleveland Water Alliance
The Cleveland Water Alliance is a network of corporations, academic institutions, and public agencies across Northeast Ohio with a common goal: address the issues of water quality and water access that are critical for life on our planet. Housed at Great Lakes Science Center, the Alliance creates conversations and connections to bring attention to these critical issues and develop an economy in Northeast Ohio around their solutions. Working with its partners and collaborators, the Alliance is coordinating a community-wide effort to improve water quality and access. Great Lakes Science Center is a founding Partner of the Alliance.

Science Phenomena
Science Phenomena is an permanent exhibition of more than 100 hands-on experiences within the Great Lakes Science Center. Exhibition stations there explore topics such as plasma, magnetism, and chaos theory.

See also
Wind power in Ohio

References

External links 

 Great Lakes Science Center
 MC2STEM High School 

Science museums in Ohio
Museums in Cleveland
NASA visitor centers
Wind power in Ohio
Downtown Cleveland
Cleveland Metropolitan School District
1996 establishments in Ohio
Museums established in 1996